Alexander Stephen may refer to:

 Alexander Charles Stephen (1893–1966) Scottish zoologist and astronomer
 Alexander Condie Stephen (1850–1908), British diplomat and translator
 Alexander Maitland Stephen (1882–1942), Canadian author
 A. G. Stephen (1862–1924), chief manager of the Hongkong and Shanghai Banking Corporation
 Alexander Stephen and Sons, a Scottish shipbuilding company

See also
 Alexander H. Stephens (1812–1883), American politician
 Alexander Hodgdon Stevens (1789–1869), American surgeon